Walnut Grove Presbyterian Church is a historic church in rural Washington County, Arkansas.  It is located southwest of Farmington, on the east side of Arkansas Highway 170.  It is a modest single-story brick church, with a cross-gable roof and a squat square belltower.  Each of its gable ends is adorned with a large three-part stained glass window.  It was built in 1903 for a congregation established in 1856, and is a locally distinctive vernacular interpretation of the Romanesque Revival.

The church was added to the National Register in 1995.

See also
National Register of Historic Places listings in Washington County, Arkansas

References

Presbyterian churches in Arkansas
Churches on the National Register of Historic Places in Arkansas
Romanesque Revival church buildings in Arkansas
Gothic Revival church buildings in Arkansas
Churches completed in 1903
Churches in Washington County, Arkansas
National Register of Historic Places in Washington County, Arkansas
1903 establishments in Arkansas